Quandara is a monotypic moth genus of the family Noctuidae described by Nye in 1975. Its only species, Quandara hypozonata, was first described by George Hampson in 1910. It is found in Panama.

The Global Lepidoptera Names Index gives this name as a synonym of Lycaugesia Hampson, 1912.

References

Acontiinae
Monotypic moth genera